Sokolinaya Gora(literal meaning: "falcon mountain" is a station on the Moscow Central Circle of the Moscow Metro located in the district of the same name. It was opened on 11 October 2016, one month after opening of the MCC. As of 2017, Sokolinaya Gora is 25th popular among 31 stations of the Circle: the average passenger traffic was 8000 people per day and 240,000 people per month.

Gallery

References

External links 
 mkzd.ru

Moscow Metro stations
Railway stations in Russia opened in 2016
Moscow Central Circle stations